Möller Group is one of the oldest German automotive companies founded in 1730 and located in Bielefeld, North Rhine-Westphalia.

Since the foundation it is a family business and became a Henokiens association member.

See also 
Henokiens

References

External links 
Homepage
Location on Google Maps.

Automotive companies of Germany
Henokiens companies
Companies established in 1730
18th-century establishments in the Holy Roman Empire